Two Mile or Twomile may refer to:

Two miles
Two Mile, Queensland
Twomile, West Virginia
Two Mile Village, Yukon
Twomile Lake, a lake in South Dakota

See also
Twomile Branch
Two Mile Hill, Saint Michael, Barbados
Two Mile Prairie (disambiguation)